A denture cleaner (also termed denture cleanser) is used to clean dentures when they are out of the mouth. The main use is to control the growth of microorganisms on the dentures, especially Candida albicans, thereby preventing denture-related stomatitis. When dentures are worn in the mouth, a biofilm develops which may be similar to dental plaque. It may become hardened and mineralized as dental calculus. Denture cleansers are also used to remove stains and other debris that may be caused by diet, tobacco use, drinking coffee, drinking tea, etc.

Some chemical denture cleaners can come in cream and liquid format.  Others come in powder, paste, or tablet format. Some chemical denture cleaners are effervescent and others are not. There are also mechanical denture cleaners such as denture brushes and ultrasonic denture cleaners that use ultrasonic cleaning, some coupled with ultraviolet light.

Ingredients

Dilute sodium hypochlorite (i.e. a mild bleach) is the main constituent of several brands of denture cleanser.

Other ingredients include such chemicals as:
 sodium bicarbonate – or baking soda, which alkalizes the water, cleaning the dentures
 citric acid – removes stains
 sodium perborate
 sodium polyphosphate
 potassium monopersulfate – cleaning and bleaching agent
 EDTA

Example commercial brands

 Sodium hypochlorite solution: Dentural, Milton, Mildent
 Alkaline peroxides: Steradent
 Other: Polident, Renew, Efferdent, Novadent

History
Dentures have been cleaned using water or mixtures of water/vinegar, water/lemon juice, water/baking soda for many years. In the 1930s, Alexander Block developed the Polident brand of denture cleaner at the Block Drug Company. Others have followed such as Warner-Lambert's introduction of Efferdent denture cleanser tablets in 1966 and Renew denture cleaner powder in 1986 by Mid-Continental Dental Supply Co. Ltd.  Over time, orthodontic and sport dental appliance cleaners have also emerged on the market such as Renew Ortho & Sport with formulations that account for thermoplastics and a younger demographic of patients.

Clinical trials and evidence
Studies have found an association between denture stomatitis, colonization of yeasts and denture cleanliness. Another study found that immersing dentures in 0.5% NaOCl solution for 3 minutes only can be an effective synergic for denture cleaning in reducing the number of microorganism without affecting the denture color or surface roughness, and when compared to alkaline peroxides, bleach was more efficient. Some clinicians recommended that the time of immersion, and the concentration of the NaOCl should be well considered so as not to degrade the acrylic resin of the denture.

References

External links
Renew Denture Cleaner
Renew Ortho & Sport Cleaner
Xodent Denture Cleaning Kit
Milton Denture Cleaner

Cleaning products
Prosthodontology